The Ghost Army was a United States Army tactical deception unit during World War II officially known as the 23rd Headquarters Special Troops.  The 1100-man unit was given a unique mission: to deceive Hitler's forces and mislead them as to the size and location of Allied forces, while giving the actual units elsewhere time to maneuver.  Activated on January 20, 1944, the Ghost Army arrived in Europe in May shortly before D-Day and returned to the US at the end of the war in July 1945. During their tenure, the Ghost Army carried out more than 20 deception campaigns, putting on a "traveling road show" utilizing inflatable tanks, sound trucks, fake radio transmissions, scripts and pretense. 

Their story was kept a secret for more than 50 years after the war, until it was declassified in 1996. The unit was the subject of a PBS documentary The Ghost Army in 2013. In February 2022, members of the Ghost Army were awarded the Congressional Gold Medal, citing their unique and highly distinguished service.

History and deployment
The Ghost Army was created by U.S. Army planners Ralph Ingersoll and Billy Harris, and led by Colonel Harry L. Leeder. Inspiration for the unit came from the British units who had honed the deception technique for Operation Bertram during the battle of El Alamein in late 1942. 

The unit had its barracks at Camp Forrest, Tennessee, and was fully formed at Camp Pine, New York (now Fort Drum), before sailing for the United Kingdom in early May 1944. In Britain they were based near Stratford upon Avon, and troops participated in Operation Fortitude, the British-designed and led D-Day deceptions of a landing force designated for the Pas-de-Calais. 

Some troops went to Normandy two weeks after D-Day, where they simulated a Mulberry harbour at night with lights intended to draw German artillery from the real ones. After this the entire unit assisted in tying up the German defenders of Brest by simulating a larger force than was actually encircling them.

As the Allied armies moved east, so did the 23rd, and it eventually was based within Luxembourg, from where it engaged in deceptions of crossings of the Ruhr river, positions along the Maginot Line, Hürtgen Forest, and finally a major crossing of the Rhine to draw German troops away from the actual sites.

Recruiting 
Ghost soldiers were encouraged to use their brains and talent to mislead, deceive, and befuddle the German Army. Many were recruited from art schools, advertising agencies and other occupations that encouraged creative thinking. In civilian life, ghost soldiers had been artists, architects, actors, set designers, engineers and lawyers.

Although the 23rd Headquarters Special Troops consisted of only 1,100 soldiers, the contingent used equipment pioneered by British forces such as dummy tanks and artillery, fake aircraft, and giant speakers broadcasting the sounds of men and artillery to make the Germans think it was upwards of a two-division 30,000-man force. The unit's elaborate ruses helped deflect German units from the locations of larger allied combat units.

The unit consisted of the 406th Combat Engineers (which handled security), the 603rd Camouflage Engineers, the 3132 Signal Service Company Special, and the Signal Company Special.

Tactics

Visual deception

The visual deception arm of the Ghost Army was the 603rd Camouflage Engineers.  It was equipped with inflatable tanks, cannons, jeeps, trucks, and airplanes that the men would inflate with air compressors, and then camouflage imperfectly so that enemy aerial reconnaissance could see them.  They could create dummy airfields, troop bivouacs (complete with fake laundry hanging on clotheslines), motor pools, artillery batteries, and tank formations in a few hours.

Many of the men in this unit were artists, recruited from New York and Philadelphia art schools.  Their unit became an incubator for young artists who sketched and painted their way through Europe.  Several of these soldier-artists went on to have a major impact on art in the postwar US.  Bill Blass, Ellsworth Kelly, wildlife artist Arthur Singer, and Art Kane were among the many artists who served in the 603rd.

Sonic deception

The 3132 Signal Service Company Special handled sonic deception. The unit coalesced under the direction of Colonel Hilton Railey, a colorful figure who, before the war, had "discovered" Amelia Earhart and sent her on the road to fame.

Aided by engineers from Bell Labs, a team from the 3132 went to Fort Knox to record sounds of armored and infantry units onto a series of sound effects records that they brought to Europe. For each deception, sounds could be "mixed" to match the scenario they wanted the enemy to believe. This program was recorded on state-of-the-art wire recorders (the predecessor to the tape recorder), and then played back with powerful amplifiers and speakers mounted on halftracks.

Radio deception

"Spoof radio", as it was called, was handled by the Signal Company. Special Operators created phony traffic nets, impersonating the radio operators from real units. Different Morse Code operators each have their own individual style of sending; the Signal Company operators mimicked a departed operator's style so that the enemy would not detect that the real unit and its radio operator were long gone.

Atmosphere

To complement existing techniques, the unit often employed theatrical effects to supplement the other deceptions. Collectively called "atmosphere", these included simulating actual units deployed elsewhere by the application of their divisional insignia, painting appropriate unit insignia on vehicles and having the individual companies deployed as if they were regimental headquarters units. The same few covered trucks or lorries, with just two troops in the visible seats near the rear to appear to be full of motorized infantry, would be driven in a loop to look like long convoys. "MPs" (military police) would be deployed at crossroads wearing appropriate divisional insignia and some personnel would dress as divisional generals and staff officers visiting towns where enemy agents or scouts were likely to see them. A few actual tanks and artillery pieces were occasionally assigned to the unit to make the "dummies" in the distance appear more realistic.

The Ghost Army of WWII Congressional Gold Medal Act 
The Ghost Army Legacy Project, under the leadership of Rick Beyer (producer and director of The Ghost Army 2013 PBS documentary), campaigned for Ghost Army recognition for six and a half years, through four Congressional terms.  Senators Ed Markey (D-MA) and Susan Collins (R-ME) co-sponsored S. 1404, and Representatives Annie Kuster (D-NH) and Chris Stewart R-UT, co-sponsored H.R. 707. The House of Representatives voted overwhelmingly to pass H.R. 707 on May 18, 2021.  The Senate bill, S. 1404, had 71 co-sponsors, four more than the required number to move forward in the Senate.  Senator Catherine Cortez-Masto (D-NV) was the 67th Senate co-sponsor.

Following a unanimous vote for passage by the Senate Banking, Housing and Urban Affairs Committee, on the evening of December 15, 2021, the full U.S. Senate passed S. 1404, the Ghost Army Congressional Gold Medal Act. On January 19, 2022, the House of Representatives also passed S. 1404.

On Tuesday, February 1, 2022, President Biden signed into law: S. 1404, the Ghost Army Congressional Gold Medal Act, which provides for the award of a Congressional Gold Medal to the Ghost Army, in recognition of their unique and highly distinguished service in conducting deception operations in Europe during World War II.  President Biden expressed gratitude to Representative Kuster and Senators Markey, Portman, Collins, and Blumenthal, among many others, for their leadership.

The American Legion, the National World War II Museum, the American Veterans Center, the National D-Day Memorial Foundation and others supported the Ghost Army of WWII Congressional Gold Medal effort.

See also

 Operation Bodyguard
Military dummy
 First United States Army Group
 Operation Bertram
 The Ghost Army, 2013 documentary
 U.S. Army Signal Corps in World War II
 List of Congressional Gold Medal Recipients
 Drunk History Season 5 Episode 8

References

Further reading

External links
Ghost Army Legacy Project
Official website of The Ghost Army documentary
Holley, Joe. (2006, July 8). Louis Dalton Porter; Used Artistic Skills to Trick German Army. The Washington Post, p. B6
 NPR: Artists of Battlefield Deception: Soldiers of the 23rd
 National Army Security Agency Association
99% Invisible Podcast - A Show of Force
ArtCurious Podcast- Episode #28: The Ghost Army (Season 2, Episode 8)

Military units and formations of the United States Army in World War II
Military history of the United States during World War II
Military camouflage
Military deception during World War II
Electronic warfare
Congressional Gold Medal recipients